Francesco Dettori (born 2 March 1983) is an Italian footballer who plays as a midfielder for Italian Serie C club Picerno.

He made his Serie B debut on 7 September 2008, whilst playing for Avellino, in a 3–1 defeat away to Triestina.

Career

Early career
Born in Sassari, Sardinia, Dettori was a player for Latte Dolce in 2000–01 Promozione season. He then left for several Serie C and Serie D clubs, such as Pescara in January 2008.

Pescara
On 7 August 2008 Dettori and Iandoli were signed by Serie B side Avellino in temporary deals from Pescara. Avellino did not excised the option to sign Dettori in a co-ownership deal.

Chievo
He joined Serie A club Chievo on 28 August 2010 in a co-ownership deal for €50,000. On the same day Roberto Inglese also joined Chievo for €600,000 and Luca Ariatti moved to Pescara for €650,000. He never played for Chievo in Serie A. He left for Triestina in January and Cremonese in temporary deals in August 2011. Chievo also signed Dettori outright in June 2011. Dettori was an unused member of Chievo in the first half of 2012–13 Serie A season.

Lega Pro clubs
In January 2013 Dettori joined Perugia for free. On 22 August he was signed by Carrarese in a 1-year contract. His contract was extended during the season. However, on 20 July 2014 Dettori was released by Carrarese again.

Pescara return
On 22 July 2014 Dettori was re-signed by Pescara. Dettori made his debut in Pescara's first match in 2014–15 Coppa Italia. He wrote no.21 shirt that season. Dettori received the call-up to the first match of 2014–15 Serie B. However, he did not play.

Return to Lega Pro
Just before the closure of the transfer window, Dettori was signed by Lega Pro newcomer Arezzo. On 28 July 2015 Dettori returned to Carrarese in a 1-year contract.

On 12 August 2020 he joined Serie D club Picerno. He helped Picerno achieve promotion to Serie C at the end of the 2020–21 season.

References

External links
 Player Profile from chievocalcio.tv  
 Player Profilefrom legaseriea.it 

1983 births
People from Sassari
Footballers from Sardinia
Living people
Italian footballers
Association football midfielders
A.S.D. Sangiovannese 1927 players
Potenza S.C. players
Delfino Pescara 1936 players
U.S. Avellino 1912 players
A.C. ChievoVerona players
U.S. Triestina Calcio 1918 players
U.S. Cremonese players
A.C. Perugia Calcio players
Carrarese Calcio players
S.S. Arezzo players
Calcio Padova players
FeralpiSalò players
AZ Picerno players
Serie B players
Serie C players
Serie D players